Islamic religious police (also sometimes known as morality police or sharia police) are official Islamic vice squad police agencies, often in Islamic countries, which enforce religious observance and public morality on behalf of national or regional authorities based on its interpretation of sharia. Modern Islamic religious police forces were first established in the late-1970s amidst the Iranian Revolution and the Islamic revival the revolution brought; prior, the administration of public morality in most Islamic countries was considered a socioreligious matter, and was enforced through application of civil laws or through more informal means.

The powers and responsibilities of Islamic religious police vary by country, but in contrast to the enforcement of laws against crimes like robbery and murder by conventional police forces, Islamic religious police have focused more on such issues as preventing the consumption of alcohol, mixing of men and women, playing of music and public display of affection, western practices such as  Valentine's Day or Christmas gifts, making sure women (but also sometimes men) observe Islamic dress code, and that Muslims are not skipping salat prayer attendance. They are sometimes portrayed as parapolice forces that mostly give citations and warnings, but in most countries they have powers similar to sworn police officers, including the power to detain people.

The practice is generally justified with reference to the doctrine of hisba, which is based on the Quranic injunction of enjoining good and forbidding evil, and refers to the duty of Muslims to promote moral rectitude and intervene when another Muslim is acting wrongly. In pre-modern Islam, its legal implementation was entrusted to a public official called muhtasib (market inspector), who was charged with preventing fraud, disturbance of public order and infractions against public morality. This last part of public morality was missing in early and medieval Islam but the office was revived in Saudi Arabia, and later instituted as a committee, aided by a volunteer force focused on enforcing religious observance. Similar institutions later appeared in several other countries and regions.

Islamic religious police organizations have been controversial both locally and internationally. Although these institutions tend to have support from conservative currents of public opinion, their activities are often disliked by other segments of the population, especially liberals, urban women, and younger people. Reforms made by Saudi rulers in 2016 sharply curtailed the authority of the Saudi religious police. Former Iranian president Hassan Rouhani has criticized Iran's religious police, but the president does not have control over it under the Iranian constitution. In the Nigerian state of Kano, the religious police has had a contentious relationship with the civil police force. Some incidents where the religious police were widely viewed as overstepping their mandate have received broad public condemnation.

History

The classical doctrine of hisba, associated with the Quranic injunction of enjoining good and forbidding wrong, refers to the duty of Muslims to promote moral rectitude and intervene when another Muslim is acting wrongly. Historically, its legal implementation was entrusted to a public official called muhtasib (market inspector), who was charged with preventing fraud, disturbance of public order and infractions against public morality. This office disappeared in the modern era everywhere in the Muslim world, including Arabia, but it was revived by the first Saudi state (1745–1818) and continued to play a role in the second (1823–87), due to its importance within Wahhabi doctrine. Under the third Saudi state, the most zealous followers of Ibn Sa'ud were appointed as muhtasibs, but their severity caused conflict with the local population and foreign pilgrims. In response, committees were established in Riyadh and Mecca in 1932 to check their excesses. In 1976 the committees were united under an official of ministerial rank, acting under direct royal command. The unified  Committee for the Promotion of Virtue and the Prevention of Vice has been assisted by volunteers, who enforce strict rules of hijab, attendance of daily prayers and gender segregation in public places. With the rising international influence of Wahhabism, the conception of hisba as an individual obligation to police religious observance has become more widespread. This has led to the appearance of activists around the world who urge fellow Muslims to observe Islamic rituals, dress code, and other aspects of sharia, with vigilante incidents in London (2013-2014) and Wuppertal, Germany (2014) resulting in criminal charges.

In Iran, hisba was enshrined in the constitution after the 1979 Revolution as a "universal and reciprocal duty", incumbent upon both the government and the people. Its implementation has been carried out by official committees as well as volunteer forces (basij). Elsewhere, policing of various interpretations of sharia-based public morality has been carried out by the Kano State Hisbah Corps in the Nigerian state of Kano, by Polisi Perda Syariah Islam in the Aceh province of Indonesia, by the Committee for the Propagation of Virtue and the Prevention of Vice in the Gaza Strip, by the Taleban during their 1996-2001 rule of Afghanistan, as well as by other groups.

Formal legalized enforcement by country

Islamic religious police forces include:

Afghanistan

Afghanistan's Committee for the Propagation of Virtue and the Prevention of Vice was first instituted by the 1992 Rabbani regime, and adopted by the Taliban when they took power in 1996. Taliban's department was modeled on a similar organization in Saudi Arabia. It was closed when the Taliban was ousted, but the Chief Justice of the Supreme Court of Afghanistan reinstated it in 2003. In 2006 the Karzai regime submitted draft legislation to create a new department, under the Ministry for Haj and Religious Affairs, devoted to the "Promotion of Virtue and Prevention of Vice". 
When the Taliban took power again in August 2021, they established a new "Ministry of Invitation, Guidance and Promotion of Virtue and Prevention of Vice", taking over the old regime's Ministry of Women’s Affairs building for use as its headquarters.

Iran

Guidance Patrol (' Gašt-e Eršād) is the main Islamic religious police, or vice squad in the Law Enforcement Force of Islamic Republic of Iran. It was established in 2005, succeeding institutions of similar nature. Its mission is to impose Islamic dress codes and norms of conduct in public, particularity regarding the hijab of women (but also some men) who are deemed improperly dressed according to the dress code. In addition, the patrol also enforces Islamic codes of conduct in public, such as preventing the mingling of unrelated men and women without a male guardian (mahram) for the latter, and preventing other types of behavior that are un-Islamic. It has been viewed as a scourge by urban women, particularly those from more affluent circles, who try to push the boundaries of dress code. President Hassan Rouhani had expressed opposition to the Guidance Patrol, but it did not fall under his constitutional jurisdiction.

On September 16, 2022, the Guidance Patrol arrested Mahsa Amini, a 22-year-old Iranian woman who they claim suffered heart failure, dying comatose two days later. Bruises on her legs and face suggested to many that she was beaten, despite police denials. Multiple medical officials and detainees that witness her arrest claim that Guidance Patrol officials tortured her in the back of a van before arriving to the station. Her arrest and death inspired a wave of protests in Iran. The Alleged dissolution of Morality Police in Iran was later denied by Iranian state media.

Malaysia

The Malaysian religious authority, known as the Federal Territories Islamic Religious Department (JAWI), enforces religious standards. Its Chief of enforcement is Wan Jaafar Wan Ahmad. Punishable offenses include khalwat, the offense of being in close proximity to any forbidden member of the opposite sex. Adultery is also an offense and may lead to up to two years in prison. According to local newspapers, the moral police have stopped hundreds of couples. Other offenses include extra-marital sex, alcohol consumption, not fasting during Ramadan, and not visiting the mosque during Friday prayer. The department also punishes gay Muslims. Malaysian morality police are often accused of overstepping their mandate, with legal confusion resulting from overlapping and ambiguously defined jurisdictions of secular and sharia-based laws.

Nigeria

In Nigeria, "religious police" are organized by state and called "Hisbah". Nigeria has twelve states—all in the north—where Islam is the dominant religion. In 1999 the states made a "declaration of full Sharia law", and consequently each state created institutions such as Sharia and Zakat commissions, and "to promote Islamic virtue" and discourage vice, "hisbah", groups.

As of 2016, each of these hisbah is "unique", varying from state sanctioned, organized, commissioned, funded groups with thousand of people on salary in large states (Kano and Zamfara), to all-unpaid, volunteer groups (Gombe), and hisbah that "exist only on paper" (Borno).

According to Human Rights Watch, as of 2004, Human Rights Watch sees as problematic the fact that "the majority" of hisbah members have "a low level of formal education, no background in law, and no training in law enforcement or procedures for arrest, investigation, or gathering of evidence.  Human Rights Watch is not aware of any women joining the hisbah in Nigeria."  While there are not set laws on hisbah procedure, according to a "common understanding" of what hisbah are allowed to do, "they are expected to arrest criminals", but not "to enter people’s private homes or spy on them merely on the basis of suspicion".  In practice, "these and other guidelines" have  often been disregarded and people’s "right to privacy" violated. Although abuses by the hisbah "appear to have decreased" since their introduction in 2000–2002.

While Hisbah members have been responsible for "flogging and beating suspected criminals", unlike some vigilante groups" as of 2004, Human Rights Watch was not aware of killings by hisba members".

In Kano state, the religious police force responsible for the enforcement of Sharia—the Kano State Hisbah Corps—was established by the state government in 2003. It institutionalized the formerly local and privately maintained hisbah security units. It operates under the jurisdiction of a Hisbah Board composed of government officials, secular police officers, and religious leaders, and is highly decentralized with local units supervised by committees composed of officials and citizens in the communities in which they operate. The Hisbah Corps does not have authority to execute arrests and are allowed to carry only non-lethal weapons for self-defense. Hisbah officers who observe violations of Sharia are expected to alert the Nigeria Police Force (NPF). The duties of the Hisbah Corps include arbitrating disputes on a voluntary basis, verbally chastising violators of Sharia, and maintaining public order at religious celebrations. Hisbah are also trained to assist with disaster response operations. The Hisbah Corps has had a contentious relationship with the NPF, with the latter frequently refusing to cooperate in enforcement of religious law, and on multiple occasions arresting Hisbah members for trespassing private property.

An example of a  Kano State Hisbah Board activity was the destruction of 1,975,000 bottles of beer worth over N200 million (almost US$500,000) in 2020 that had been confiscated within metropolitan Kano.   
Another 2020 news report alleged frustration by Nigerian youths with zealous enforcement of hisbah in northern Nigeria in general and Kaduna state in particular, quoting one resident as saying, 
“Hisbah is punishing youths for keeping afro hair and sometimes it is accompanied with beating. They have also prevented women and girls from using smartphones, claiming that it is used to spread unIslamic behaviours. They are just terrorising us."

Saudi Arabia

The Committee for the Promotion of Virtue and the Prevention of Vice, (abbreviated CPVPV and colloquially termed hai’a (committee), whose enforcers are referred to as muttawa, mutaween (pl.)), are tasked with enforcing conservative Islamic norms of public behavior, as defined by Saudi authorities. They monitor observance of the dress code, gender segregation in public spaces, and whether shops are closed during prayer times.

Established in its best known form in the mid-1970s, by the early 2010s, the committee was estimated to have 3,500–4,000 officers on the streets, assisted by thousands of volunteers and administrative personnel. Its head held the rank of cabinet minister and reported directly to the king. Committee officers and volunteers  patrolled public places, with volunteers focusing on enforcing strict rules of hijab (which in Saudi Arabia meant covering all of the body except the hands and eyes), segregation between the sexes, and daily prayer attendance; but also banning Western products/activities such as the sale of dogs and cats, Barbie dolls, Pokémon, and Valentine's Day gifts.  Officers were authorized to pursue, detain and interrogate suspected violators, flog offenders for certain misdeeds, and arrest  priests for saying Mass in private ceremonies.
In some cases, the Saudi religious police were broadly condemned in the country, including cases of breaking into private homes on suspicion of illicit behavior, and being staffed by "ex-convicts whose only job qualification was that they had memorized the Qur'an in order to reduce their sentences". Perhaps the most serious incident for which they were blamed  was the 2002 Mecca girls' school fire, where fifteen girls died and fifty were injured after the mutaween prevented them from escaping a burning school, because the girls were not wearing headscarves and abayas (black robes), and not accompanied by a male guardian. The firemen who arrived to help, were also beaten by the mutaween. Widespread public criticism followed, both internationally and within Saudi Arabia.

The institution had general support among conservative currents of public opinion, but was widely disliked by liberals and younger people. In  2016 the power of the CPVPV was drastically reduced  by Mohammed bin Salman, and it was banned "from pursuing, questioning, asking for identification, arresting and detaining anyone suspected of a crime".

Sudan

The Community Service Police serves as the Sudanese religious police. Originally called the Public Order Police, the enforcement agency was established in 1993 by President Omar al-Bashir. The Public Order Law was initiated by the Sudanese government in the state of Khartoum in 1992, and later applied to all states. The name was changed in 2006. The Community Service Police is in charge of enforcing regulations on certain personal behaviors, including indecent clothing, alcohol consumption, offensive acts and seduction, among others. In June 2015, 10 female students were charged with "indecent dress" after exiting their church. All of the women were wearing long-sleeved shirts and either skirts or trousers. In December 2017, 24 women were arrested at a private gathering for wearing trousers. They were later released. Punishment can include flogging and the payment of fines. The Public Order Court, which handles such cases, is a parallel court system which exercises summary judgements. Many Sudanese resent the activity of the religious police as oppressive and arbitrarily intrusive, although it is supported by Salafists and other religious conservatives. 
Following the July 2019 overthrow of Omar al-Bashir, Sudan began a "transition to democracy". In December 2019, it repealed a public order law that granted police the power to arrest women "who were found dancing, wearing trousers, vending on the streets or mixing with men who weren’t their relatives", who might then be punished by "flogging, fines and, in rare cases, stoning and execution". A 3 September 2020 agreement (as part of a 2019 'legal reform program and rebuilding and developing the justice and rights') declared Sudan "a multi-racial, multi-ethnic, multi-religious and multi-cultural society", where the state would  "not establish an official religion" and where no citizen would "be discriminated against based on their religion", thus eliminating the raison d'être for the Community Service Police.

Al-Qaeda and ISIL-controlled areas 

 A religious police called al-Hisba operated as of 2017 in Idlib, which is ruled by Syrian rebels linked and allied to Al-Qaeda.
 The militant group ISIL used religious police, commonly known as the Hisbah, in areas under its control.

Issues of enforcement

Haircuts
In 2020, the Kano state Nigeria Islamic police shaved off the Mohawk hairstyles of young men on the pavements of Kano city.  Another report state that afro hair was punished by Hisbah in another Nigerian state, Kaduna.  In Afghanistan, it was reported on 25 January 2001, the Taliban had arrested 28 barbers in Kabul for giving customers a haircut styled after Leonardo DiCaprio in the film Titanic, according to officials at the Afghan mission in Islamabad.

Hijab
After the 1979 Iranian Islamic Revolution, hijab was made compulsory in stages. In 1980 it was made mandatory in government and public offices, and in 1983 it became mandatory for all women (including non-Muslims and non-citizens). From 2017 to 2019 protests were held against compulsory hijab with authorities announcing the arrests of 29 women.

Mannequins
In 2009, Iranian police warned shopkeepers not to display female mannequins with bodily curves or without a hijab.  In 2010, to protect "public morality", the Palestinian Islamist group Hamas ordered the removal of scantily-clad mannequins and pictures of models in underwear from clothing shops in the Gaza Strip.  In 2021, the Islamic police force or "Hisbah" in Kano, a Muslim-majority state in Nigeria, ordered shops to use only  headless mannequins to advertise clothing, and for the mannequins to be covered at all times.

See also

 Ban on sharia law
 Criticism of Islam
 Islamization
 Sharia

Notes

References

Further reading

External links

 
 
 

 
Sex segregation enforcement
Religious police
Religious police
Religious police
Islamic extremism
Police
Prohibition
Religious discrimination